Yarwng is a 2008 Kokborok feature film produced by Don Bosco Sampari Pictures Tripura, written and directed by Joseph Pulinthanath. The story of the 95-minute feature film revolves round the large-scale displacement which happened in Tripura state, in northeast India, when the newly built Dumbur dam (1970s) submerged huge areas of arable land in the fertile Raima valley about 40 years ago. The film won the first national film award for Tripura at the 56th National Film Awards in (2008)

Plot Summary 
The protagonist, Sukurai, has just learnt that his wife Karmati had once been the fiancée of his jhum companion Wakhirai. Karmati says she and Wakhirai were to be married but on the night before their wedding a newly built dam submerged her village and separated them forever. Wakhirai moved out along with his family and his ailing father died on the way. Wakhirai tells Sukurai that his meeting Karmati is just a co-incidence. Sukurai, himself a victim of the same catastrophe, suggests a reunion between Karmati and Wakhirai. Karmati goes to Wakhirai’s house but finds him missing. But the poor woman is ready to face her destiny bravely and keeps waiting.

Cast 
 Meena Debbarma as Kormoti
 Nirmal Jamatia as Uakhirai
 Surabhi Debbarma
 Sushil Debbarma as Sukurai
 Debra Bimal Singh Debbarma
 Ainati Jasmine Debbarma
 Yathek Judharam Reang
 Grandpa Nikunja Molsom
 Ochai Manohar Jamatia
 Ochai’s Wife Padhirung Reang
 Choudhury Amulya Ratan Jamatia
 Choudhury’s wife Suchitra Debbarma
 Agent Madan Debbarma
 Agurai Galem Debbarma
 Mereng Rabindra Jamatia
 Thunta Nanda Hari Jamatia
 Kekli Krishna Chura Jamatia
 Moi Usha Debbarma
 Nobar Laldiga Molsom
 Berma Boy Mishan Debbarma
 Berma Boy’s Ma Buddhalaxmi Debbarma
 Agurai’s Wife Shantirung Reang
 Khumbarti Purnarung Reang
 Khumbarti’s Daughter Mari Reang
 Khumbarti’s son Vikas Reang
 Villager with Townsmen Pabiram Reang
 Soldiers Ajit Roga, Rabi Debbarma, Subudh Debbarma

Themes 
Yarwng depicts the lives of ordinary people striving to preserve their humanity in the face of abrupt social change and economic desperation. Yarwng is based on true events of displacement and resettlement problem of Indigenous Tripuri people caused by the Dumbor Hydel Power Project commissioned in 1976 by the Indian Government. The film examines the aftermath of the Dam construction over the confluence Raima-Saima River on the local people socio-economic, relationships and loss of home.

Production 
The film was produced by Joseph Kizhakechennadu and was directed by Father Joseph Pulinthanath. Both are priests of the Don Bosco mission and Yarwng was their second film. The film was partially funded by the Catholic Church in India. Filming in the Tripura district took one month.

Award
The film won the Best Feature Film in Kokborok award at the 56th National Film Awards. The producer and director received their award from Indian president Pratibha Patil.

References 

Kokborok
2008 films
Films shot in Tripura
Cinema of Tripura
Kokborok-language films